Awra Briguela is a Filipino child actor.

Awra or AWRA may also refer to:
 A term referring to intimate parts in Islam
Awra Amba, an Ethiopian community 
American Water Resources Association (AWRA)